Skyforger is the ninth studio album by Finnish heavy metal band Amorphis. Like the previous album, the lyrics to Skyforger are English translations of Finnish poems based on the Kalevala and written by Pekka Kainulainen. Unlike the two previous albums, it is based on different parts of several episodes, but all told from a single character's point of view. In this sense it is a return to Tales from the Thousand Lakes which told stories from different parts of the Kalevala. The last two albums focused on Kullervo and Lemminkäinen, respectively, and this one focuses on Ilmarinen.

Like Amorphis's previous two albums, Eclipse and Silent Waters, Skyforger is a concept album and was recorded at Sonic Pump Studios in Helsinki.

In addition to a regular edition, the album was also released in a limited digipak edition which included the bonus track "Godlike Machine". Initially, this digipak edition caused controversy because of sound level fluctuations during the tracks "My Sun" and "Skyforger", but Nuclear Blast has since remedied the problem by promising replacement CDs.

On 22 April 2009, "Silver Bride" was released as a Finland-only single, peaking at number 1. The music video for the single premiered on 11 May 2009.

The album's sound has been described as melodic death metal with influences from progressive metal, power metal and folk metal. The album was honored with a 2009 Metal Storm Award for Best Heavy Metal Album.

Track listing 
All lyrics by Pekka Kainulainen. All music as noted.

Chart positions

Personnel

Amorphis 
Tomi Joutsen – vocals
Esa Holopainen – lead guitar
Tomi Koivusaari – rhythm guitar
Niclas Etelävuori – bass
Santeri Kallio – keyboards, synthesizers, piano, organ
Jan Rechberger – drums
Amorphis – arrangements

Other personnel 
Iikka Kahri – flute & saxophone
Jouni Markkanen – backing vocals
Peter James Goodman – backing vocals
Tommi Salmela – backing vocals
Marko Hietala – backing vocals, vocal production
Sami Koivisto – engineering
Mika Jussila – mastering
Mikko Karmila – mixing
伊藤政則  (Itoh Masanori (Masa Itoh)) – Japanese liner notes

Lyrics 
Pekka Kainulainen – lyrics
Erkki Virta – lyrics translation
国田ジンジャ一  (Ginger Kunita) – Japanese lyric translation

Photography 
Travis Smith -	cover art
Denis Goria – band photography

References 

2009 albums
Amorphis albums
Concept albums
Nuclear Blast albums
Albums with cover art by Travis Smith (artist)
Music based on the Kalevala